Varden may refer to:

People
Erik Varden (born 1974), Norwegian Roman Catholic prelate
Evelyn Varden (1893-1958), American actress
Helga Varden, American philosopher
Norma Varden (1898-1989), English actress
Varden Tsulukidze (1865–1923), Georgian military commander and anti-Soviet resistance leader

Places
Varden Conservation Area, a state park in Pennsylvania in the United States
Varden, Stavanger, a neighborhood in the city of Stavanger in Rogaland county, Norway
Varden Amfi, a football venue in Bergen, Norway

Other
IL Varden, a multi-sports club in Meråker, Norway
Varden (newspaper), a Norwegian publication
The Varden, a group of rebels in the Inheritance Cycle series of fantasy novels

See also
Vardan
Dolly Varden (disambiguation)